Christina Courtenay is the pseudonym used by Pia Tapper Fenton (b. England), a British-Swedish writer of romance novels since 2009. She was elected the twenty-sixth Chairman (2013–2015) of the Romantic Novelists' Association.

Biography
Pia Tapper was born in England, United Kingdom, daughter of an English father and a Swedish mother. She grew up in Sweden. At 16, her family moved to Tokyo, Japan. Now, she lives between London and Herefordshire. She is married with two children.

Bibliography

Single novels
 Marry in Haste (2009)
 Once Bitten, Twice Shy (2010)
 Desperate Remedies (2011)
 Never Too Late (2011)
 New England Rocks (2013)
 The Velvet Cloak of Moonlight (2016)
 Echoes of the Runes (2020)
 Runes of Destiny (2020)
 Whispers of the Runes (2021)
 Tempted by the Runes (2021)
 Hidden in the Mist (2022)

Kinross Saga
 Trade Winds (2010)
 Highland Storms (2011)
 Monsoon Mists (2014)

Kumashiro Saga
 The Scarlet Kimono (2011)
 The Gilded Fan (2012)
 The Jade Lioness (2015)

Shadows from the Past Serie
 The Silent Touch of Shadows (2012)
 The Secret Kiss of Darkness (2014)
 The Soft Whisper of Dreams (2015)

References and sources

English romantic fiction writers
Year of birth missing (living people)
Place of birth missing (living people)
Living people